The Kilfenora Céilí Band is one of the oldest céilí bands in Ireland. It was founded in 1909 in Kilfenora, a village in County Clare.

History
The first group of céilí musicians played in the old schoolhouse in Kilfenora in 1909. A new Catholic priest invited local fiddler Michael Slattery to form a band to play at fundraising dances to help clear parish debts and refurbish the church. It was also an opportunity for musicians to play at local houses or cross road dances.

The members of the band changed over the years. Early players included fiddler John Joe Lynch and his sister Brigid McGrath on concertina, Jim Mulqueeney and Austin Tierney on fiddle, and Jim McCormack on flute. For bigger events, local musicians such as Jimmy Leyden (drums) and Pat Madigan (bass) and McCormack augmented the band.

PJ Lynch started re-organising the band in 1953, and they won three "All-Ireland Fleadh Cheoil" titles in a row, in 1954, 1955 and 1956. Thereafter they became extremely busy on the céilí circuit, travelling and playing all over the country. The busy schedule forced PJ Lynch to step back, and his place as manager of the band was taken over by Kitty Lennane, who also played piano in the band. She retained this position for 40 years.

In the 1960s the band played in England regularly to large crowds at halls in Manchester, Birmingham and London. Things quietened during the 70s and 80s however, due to changes in musical taste. In July 1992 the Kilfenora population gathered to pay tribute to the band as they celebrated their 85th anniversary. The event was broadcast live on RTÉ radio. Then in 1993, John Lynch, son of PJ, took over as bandleader with the intention of  re-entering the competition for the All-Ireland Fleadh Cheoil. This was achieved spectacularly by the band repeating its 1950s feat of winning the All-Ireland 4 years in a row (1993-6).

Band members 
Membership according to the band's website :
 John Lynch - Banjo
 Fintan McMahon - Piano
 Sean Griffin - Drums
 Anne Rynne and Annemarie McCormack - Fiddles
Sinéad Heagney: Fiddle & Viola
Eimear Howley: Fiddle, Viola, Banjo & Mandolin
 Anthony Quigney: Flute, Whistle & Piano 
 Garry Shannon - Flute and Whistle
 Claire Griffin: Accordion
 Tim Collins: Concertina
 Brian O’Grady on Double Bass
Sharon Howley: Cello

Former player

 Jimmy Ward
 Aidan McMahon 
 Mike Butler 
 Séamus Connolly

Guest players
Over the years the band had many guest players, including Nell Galvin and her son Stephen. That time they played an unnamed reel, that promptly was baptized "Mrs Galvin's" by the Band.

Discography
 The Kilfenora Ceili Band (1994)
 Set on Stone (1995)
 Live in Lisdoonvarna (2002)
 Century (2009)
 Chapter Eight (2011)
 Now is the Hour (2015)
 Both Sides Now (2019)

References

External links
 Official website
 

Irish folk musical groups
Musical groups from County Clare
Musical groups established in 1909
Claddagh Records artists